Ghebrezgiabhier Kibrom (born 1 February 1987) is an Eritrean long-distance runner. He came 8th at the 2015 London Marathon and competed in the men's marathon at the 2017 World Championships in Athletics held in London, England. He also competed in the 2016 London Marathon and 2017 London Marathon.

References

External links

1987 births
Living people
Eritrean male long-distance runners
Eritrean male marathon runners
World Athletics Championships athletes for Eritrea
Place of birth missing (living people)
21st-century Eritrean people